Pacific Princess may refer to:

"Pacific Princess", the name of a B-25 Mitchell surviving aircraft
Pacific Princess, a cruise ship owned and operated by Princess Cruises between 1975 and 2002, then sold and renamed the MS Pacific before being retired and dismantled in 2013
Pacific Princess, a cruise ship owned and operated by Princess Cruises between 2002 and 2021, then sold to Azamara and renamed Azamara Onward in 2021